Darling is a 2010 Indian Telugu-language romantic comedy film directed by A. Karunakaran. It is produced by B. V. S. N. Prasad under his studio Sri Venkateswara Cine Chitra. The film stars Prabhas and Kajal Aggarwal. The music is composed by G. V. Prakash Kumar. It turned out to be a Hit at the box-office and was one of the highest grossing Telugu movies in 2010.

Released on 23 April 2010, the film received generally positive reviews and was commercially successful. The film later was remade in Kannada as Bulbul (2013) starring Darshan and Rachita Ram.

Plot
This movie starts in the late 1980s when a group of friends celebrate their farewell party. They promise each other to keep in touch. Among them are Hanumanta Rao, who has a son named Prabha, and Vishwanath who has a daughter named Nandini. To reach their professional goals, Vishwanath and Nandini travel to Switzerland, while Hanumanta Rao becomes a criminal lawyer and settles in India. Thus, Prabha and Nandini get separated in their childhood.

Years later, these old friends call for a reunion where a grown-up Prabha is eager to see his lover Nandini, but Nisha, the daughter of a local don attempts suicide when Prabha does not accept her love. Her father tries to kill Prabha and his friends, but Prabha gets out of trouble by faking a story about his childhood love Nandini.

During the reunion at Bhadram's farmhouse, Prabha happens to see Nandini. He tries various tantrums to impress her, but in vain. His attempts are always thwarted by her brother. One day, he knowingly gives a lead about his sister's favourite game of basketball, forcing Prabha and his team to create a basketball court. As they play basketball, Rishi, Appala Raju's son gatecrashes into the game as he is cheered by Nandini. Both Rishi and Prabha vie with each other to impress Nandini, leading to a cold war between them.

Meanwhile, Bhadram's daughter, Prasanna confesses to Prabha that she was in love with a man and would marry him if she could pay a dowry of 5 million, and she forces Prabha to talk to her father into marrying off her to her boyfriend. Prabha is able to convince Bhadram about his daughter's marriage with the help of his father and his friends. Impressed by his managing skills, Nandini begins to show affection to Prabha. Jealous of Nandini's liking for Prabha, Rishi's friends try to paralyse Prabha by disconnecting the power cable of an iron box. Hanumanta Rao, unaware of their conspiracy, accidentally touches the iron box and gets an electric shock, leading to a scuffle between Prabha and Rishi. The fight results in Hanumanta Rao ejecting Prabha out of the house.

Later, Prabha finds out that Rishi is not Appala Raju's son, but Vishwanath's nephew. Vishwanath betrayed his father by marrying his girlfriend rather than the girl chosen by his father. As a result, he is ousted by his father. Hanumanta Rao, on Viswanath's behalf, negotiates with his father for a reconciliation. After many attempts, he agrees to forgive Viswanath, but on the condition that his daughter's son should marry Nandini.

Prabha decides not to reveal his love for Nandini and makes up his mind to leave. As Prabha tries to leave, Nandini reveals that she was in love with him all along. She was playing hard to get with him, only to know how much he loves her. However, to save his father's reputation, he does not reveal his love to her and leaves the place, leaving Nandini heartbroken. Nisha's father too realizes the truth that the story Prabha had said was a lie, and tries to kill him. Meanwhile, Nandini gets to know the truth behind Prabha's silence and injures herself on purpose as she is angry at Hanumanta Rao. She tells Vishwanath that she loves Prabha and she wants to marry him. Feeling bad for her, he agrees to her proposal. Hanumanta Rao reminds him of the condition, but Viswanath says no and reminds him of their friendship for helping each other. Even Viswanath's father feels emotional about it, so he forgives his son and allows Nandini to marry Prabha.

Outside, Nandini runs to Prabha and sees him getting beaten up by Nisha's father. He sends his men to kill her, but Prabha manages to stop them and save Nandini. Nisha's father later raises a gun at Prabha, but Nandini pleads him to not shoot and shows her love for Prabha. Feeling emotional, Nisha's father lowers the gun and lets them go. Prabha and Nandini finally get married and live a happy life.

Cast

 Prabhas as Prabhas "Prabha"
 Kajal Aggarwal as Nandini
 Prabhu as Hanumanta Rao (Prabha's father)
 Thulasi Shivamani as Rajeswari (Prabha's mother)
 Shraddha Das as Nisha
 Ahuti Prasad as Vishwanath
 Chandra Mohan as Bhadram
 Mukesh Rishi as Nisha's father
 Kota Srinivasa Rao as Vishwanath's father
 M. S. Narayana as Appala Raju and Father (Flashback)
 Dharmavarapu Subrahmanyam as Buchchaiah Mama and Booch Thomas (Flashback)
 Vamsi Krishna as Rishi Varma
 Srinivasa Reddy as Prabha's friend
 Prabhas Sreenu as Prabha's friend
 Sivannarayana Naripeddi as Hanumanta Rao's friend
 Narsing Yadav as Mukesh Rishi's henchman
 Russell Geoffrey Banks as Child Kidnapper
 Master Gaurav as Nandini's younger brother
 Shilpa as Prasanna
 Narasimha as Gopal(Prabha's friend)
 Raja Sridhar as Prabha's friend
 Rama Rao as Prabha's friend
 Arun Kumar as Hanumanta Rao's friend
 Gurumukh Singh as Hanumanta Rao's friend
 David Firestar as Civilian
 Alex Martin as Gang Leader

Soundtrack

The film had its audio release function on 8 April at Cyber Gardens, Hyderabad.

Reception
The film opened to positive reviews. The Times of India gave a two and half star rating explaining "Director A. Karunakaran extracts good performances from his actors, but can't come up with a refreshing plot. It looks like the director hasn't really come out of his Tholi Prema hangover as he dishes out yet another one-sided love saga but fails to come up with a valid and logical reason to make a Gen Z lad to hold back his feelings for his lover until the last moment. However, he compensates it all, by adding loads of fun moments in the film and the screenplay does have its share of some touching moments". Sify noted "Prabhas looked very handsome and his performance can be termed as the major highlight of the film". Rediff felt that the film "is entertaining" and lauded the director for "showcasing clean wholesome family entertainment". Local review sites GreatAndhra and Idlebrain both gave a three star rating and praised the actors performance and technical works of the film.

Awards and nominations

Remakes 
Darling movie was remade in Kannada as Bulbul starring Darshan, Ambareesh, Ramya Barna, Rachita Ram and directed by M.D Shridhar and Produced by Meena Thoogudeepa. and Urdu as Dil Deewana. It was later dubbed in Hindi under the title Sabse Badhkar Hum.

Notes

References

External links
 

2010 romantic comedy-drama films
2010 films
Films directed by A. Karunakaran
Telugu films remade in other languages
Films scored by G. V. Prakash Kumar
Indian romantic comedy-drama films
2010s Telugu-language films